The Charlotte 49ers are the intercollegiate athletics teams that represent the University of North Carolina at Charlotte in Charlotte, North Carolina. The 49ers compete at the National Collegiate Athletic Association (NCAA) Division I level as a member of Conference USA (C-USA) in most sports. The men's soccer team joined the American Athletic Conference in July 2022, one year before the rest of the athletic program joins The American.

The university sponsors 18 varsity athletic teams, nine for each gender, and will also be adding a women's lacrosse team in the 2024–25 school year. The other sports sponsored are baseball, men's and women's basketball, men's and women's cross country, men's and women's golf, football, men's and women's soccer, softball, men's and women's tennis, men's and women's outdoor and indoor track and field, and women's volleyball.

Overview and history

Name 
The athletics department officially changed its name to simply Charlotte in 2000. Before then, the school's identity suffered from years of constant confusion, most commonly confused with the University of North Carolina at Chapel Hill (Tar Heels). While UNCC and UNC Charlotte were the officially accepted athletic names, media outlets frequently used unofficial nicknames such as N.C.-Charlotte, N.C.-Char, North Carolina-Charlotte, UNC, UNC-C, UNCC at Charlotte, and others. When the name change was made official, Athletics Director Judy Rose summarized the sentiment that drove the name change:

While the school's legal name remains the University of North Carolina at Charlotte, it changed its academic brand name in 2021 to simply "Charlotte".

Nickname 
The nickname "49ers" derives from the fact that the university's predecessor—Charlotte Center of the University of North Carolina (CCUNC – established in 1946) was saved from being shut down by the state in 1949 by Bonnie Cone, when CCUNC became Charlotte College. Due to this "49er spirit" that Cone felt embodied the university, referring to the settlers that endured much hardships in traveling across the United States to seek fortune in the California Gold Rush, students of the fledgling UNC Charlotte chose "49ers" as the school's mascot. The fact that the University's Main Campus front entrance is located on North Carolina Highway 49 is pure coincidence.

Prior to the "49ers" moniker, the athletic teams were known as the "Owls" due to CCUNC's beginnings as a night school.

Logo 

The primary athletics logo, called the "All-In C", contains a pick-axe, a reference to the Gold Rush, inside a stylized block C placed at a 9° angle. According to the university, this signifies "positive energy and forward momentum".

Conference affiliations

Conference realignment 
Previously, UNC Charlotte was a charter member of the Sun Belt Conference and the Metro Conference, before joining Conference USA in 1995.

Despite a popular and competitive Conference USA in which UNC Charlotte enjoyed rivalries with the likes of Memphis, Louisville, Cincinnati, Marquette, and others, the collegiate sports landscape underwent a major restructuring in 2004–2005. C-USA took the most serious hit of any conference, losing many of its most successful members, including Charlotte.

After this dramatic reshuffle, UNC Charlotte received an invitation to join the Atlantic 10 Conference, which it accepted. Upon joining the A-10, Charlotte experienced much success in nearly every category with the exception of the signature sport of men's basketball.

With football upgrades on the horizon, and an attempt to restore geographic rivalries, UNC Charlotte returned to a revised Conference USA starting with the 2013–2014 academic season, except for football, where they joined in 2015, and was fully eligible in 2016.

On October 21, 2021 Charlotte was accepted along with 5 other Conference USA teams to join the American Athletic Conference, joining former Metro Conference and C-USA rivals there. The 2023 entry date was officially confirmed in June 2022.

Conference membership 
Dixie Intercollegiate Athletic Conference (NAIA, 1965–1970)
Independent (1970–1976)
Sun Belt Conference (1976–1991)
Metro Conference (1991–1995)
Conference USA (1995–2005)
Atlantic 10 Conference (2005–2013)
Conference USA (2013 ff. except football, 2015 football-2023^)
American Athletic Conference (2022–present in men's soccer; 2023* for other sports)

^ Planned departure date
* Planned join date

Sports sponsored 
A member of Conference USA,  UNC Charlotte currently sponsors teams in nine men's and nine women's NCAA sanctioned sports:

Baseball 

First season: 1979
Conference Championships (4)
1993, 2007, 2008, 2011
NCAA Tournament Appearances (5)
1993 (0-2)
1998 (0-2)
2007 (2-2)
2008 (0-2)
2011 (1-2)
2021 (1-2)
Recognized Jerseys
7 Barry Shifflett
15 Tim Collie
5 Joey Anderson
31 Adam Mills
4 Bo Robinson

Men's basketball 

First season: 1965-1966
Conference Championships (8)
1969, 1970, 1977, 1988, 1992, 1995, 1999, 2001
NCAA Tournament Appearances (11)
1977 (Final Four)
1988 (1st Round)
1992 (1st Round)
1995 (1st Round)
1997 (2nd Round)
1998 (2nd Round)
1999 (2nd Round)
2001 (2nd Round)
2002 (1st Round)
2004 (1st Round)
2005 (1st Round)
NIT Appearances (7)
1976 (Finals), 1989, 1994, 2000, 2006, 2008, 2013
Recognized Jerseys
33 Cedric Maxwell
32 Melvin Watkins
34 Henry Williams
23 Jarvis Lang
4 Byron Dinkins
45 Charles Hayward
4 DeMarco Johnson
13 Eddie Basden
Coach Lee Rose
Coach Jeff Mullins

Women's basketball 

First season: 1975-1976
Conference Championships (4)
1990, 2003, 2006, 2009
NCAA Appearances (2)
2003 (1st Round)
2009 (1st Round)
2022 (1st Round)
WNIT Appearances (13)
1990, 2004, 2005, 2006, 2007, 2008, 2010, 2011 (WNIT Final Four), 2012, 2013, 2016, 2019, 2021
Recognized Jerseys
21 Paula Bennett
35 Kristen Wilson

Football 

The first football program developed in 1946 and lasted until 1948. In 2006 students and alumni began a push for football to return to the school. The Board of Trustees approved it in 2008, and with funding approved in 2010, the school fielded its first official varsity football program since 1948 in 2013. The team would post a 5–6 record in their first season under coach Brad Lambert.
First season: 2013
Conference Championships (0)
Bowl Games (1; Bahamas Bowl, 2019)
Retired Jerseys (0)
NFL Draft Picks as of 2020 (4)

Track & Field 

The Track & Field team boasted the most decorated athlete in school history, Shareese Woods. While at UNC Charlotte (2003-2007) she became a four time All American, placing 4th at multiple NCAA Championships, and breaking 12 school records.
She went on to compete internationally in the sprints and made numerous United States teams at the 2006 NACAC Under-23 Championships in Athletics, 2007 NACAC Championships, 2007 Pan American Games and 2008 IAAF World Indoor Championships, medaling at all of those competitions.

Men's golf 

Consensus #1 in the nation by three major polls: Golfweek, Golfstat, and Nike – Fall 2007 (First National Number 1 Ranking in any varsity sport for Charlotte)
Conference Championships (6)
2006, 2007, 2008, 2009, 2010, 2011
NCAA Championship 3rd Place – 2007
NCAA Championship 8th Place – 2008

Women's golf 

Women's Golf was added to the Charlotte sports lineup for the 2017–18 school year. Holly Clark was hired to be the program's first coach.

Men's soccer 

First Season: 1976
Conference Championships (6)
1983, 1992, 1994, 1996, 2010, 2013
Regular Season Championships (dating back to 2011) 
2011,  2012,  2014,  2016
NCAA Appearances (14)
1991, 1992, 1994, 1996, 1997, 2009, 2011, 2012, 2013, 2014, 2015, 2016, 2018, 2019, 2020, 2021
NCAA Men's College Cup 1996, 2011
NCAA Men's Soccer Championship Game, 2011
Overall Record since 2011
85-29-16 (W% of 71.5)
Home Record since 2011
50-10-6 (W% of 80.3)
Charlotte alumnus Jon Busch named MLS Top Goalkeeper

Women's soccer 

First Season: 1994
Conference Championships (7)
1997, 2002, 2006, 2007, 2008, 2010, 2016
NCAA Appearances (4)
1998, 2002, 2007, 2008
Women's 3-time defending Atlantic 10 Regular Season Champions
Women's 2-time defending A-10 Tournament Champions

Softball 

The 49ers softball team began play in 1986. The team has not made an NCAA Tournament appearance. The current head coach is Ashley Chastain.

Rivalries 
Charlotte has had its fair share of intense rivalries. In men's basketball, one of their most heated rivalries was with Conference USA rival Cincinnati, who was coached by Bob Huggins for most of this period. From 1995-96 to 2004-05, after which Charlotte and Cincinnati left C-USA, Charlotte managed to upset Cincinnati teams ranked #3, #8, #18, #20 in the country. In what became known as the Cincinnati Incident, a brawl broke out between Cincinnati and the Charlotte student section, when a Cincinnati player threw the basketball into the stands. This led to the creation of a 'buffer zone' being implemented behind the visiting team's bench. ESPN commentator Andy Katz provided this explanation on why Charlotte-Cincinnati was one of the juiciest rivalries in the country: "The games are hotly contested usually and the fans in Charlotte don't like Cincinnati. They get up for this game more than any other."  Charlotte holds an all time record of 8-15 against Cincinnati, and haven't played each other since 2006

Charlotte's 29-year men's basketball rivalry with the Davidson Wildcats sees two of the three Division I schools in Mecklenburg County go head-to-head for the Hornet's Nest Trophy. They had been the county's only D-I schools before Queens moved from NCAA Division II to the D-I ASUN Conference in 2022. Charlotte leads the series 26-11. Due to a scheduling conflict, the series was on hiatus until the 2010-11 season.

Recently Charlotte has started to develop a rivalry with the Appalachian State Mountaineers. Charlotte's establishment of a football team, and the competitiveness of the subsequent contests in that sport, have led to a renewed interest and developing rivalry, with games scheduled through 2030.

Facilities 
Athletic facilities at Charlotte have improved dramatically over the past decade. In 1996, men's basketball returned to campus full-time for the first time in nearly 20 years with the opening of Dale F. Halton Arena. A new outdoor sports facility, the Irwin Belk Track and Field Center, opened in 1999 and serves as the home to the 49ers track and field teams in addition to both men's and women's soccer. Tom & Lib Phillips Field, the baseball facility, underwent a $6 million overhaul that was completed in 2007; the facility was renamed Robert and Mariam Hayes Stadium in honor of the renovation's benefactor and her late husband. The golf team's practice facility at Rocky River Golf Club in Concord was completed in October 2006.

Further reading
Bonnie Cone and Football at Charlotte

References

External links